İkinci Alıbəyli (also, İkinji Alibeyli) is a village in the Zangilan Rayon district in the south-west of Azerbaijan.

References 

Populated places in Zangilan District